Spen Valley may refer to:

 River Spen, in West Yorkshire, England
 Spen Valley (UK Parliament constituency) (1885–1950)
 Spen Valley Line, a railway connecting Bradford with Mirfield via the Spen Valley